Dhanaura (or Mandi Dhanaura) is a city and a municipal board (nagar palika parishad) in Amroha district  in the state of Uttar Pradesh, India. Dhanaura is also known as Mandi Dhanaura, its native name.

Geography 
It has an average elevation of 212 metres (695 feet).

Demographics
Dhanaura has a majority of 76 Muslim voters, followed by Jats and Jatavs (45,000 each), 7,000 Prajapati, 7,000 Chauhan, 8,000 SC and about 22,000 Saini voters.

References 

Cities and towns in Amroha district